Elmhurst Community Unit School District 205  (D205) is a school district headquartered in Elmhurst, Illinois in the Chicago metropolitan area.
It serves sections of Elmhurst, Addison, and Bensenville.

History

In 1995 a school bond of $15 million was proposed. In 1993 the district had 6,173 students, and Emerson School had rented church facilities for excess students.

Schools
High school:
 York Community High School

Middle schools:
 Bryan Middle School
Churchville Middle School
 Sandburg Middle School

Elementary schools:
 Edison Elementary
 Emerson Elementary
 Field Elementary
 Fischer Elementary
 Hawthorne Elementary
 Jackson Elementary
 Jefferson Elementary
 Lincoln Elementary

Early childhood:
 Madison Early Childhood Center

See also
 Joan Raymond - Former superintendent

References

External links
 
School districts in DuPage County, Illinois